Folk mathematics may refer to:

 The mathematical folklore that circulates among mathematicians
 The informal mathematics used in everyday life

See also
 Folk theorem (disambiguation)

Numerals in Koro Language -language of Indigenous People by N. C. Ghosh. Science and culture, 82(5-6) 189-193, 2016
Folk Mathematics : Concepts & Definition  - An Out Line by N.C.Ghosh,  Rabindra Bharati Patrika Vol. XII, No. 2, 2009 
Folklore Study. LOKDARPAN - Journal of the Dept. of Folklore by N.C.Ghosh, Kalyani University. Vol. 3, No. 2,  2007